Schwarzenbach is a river of Baden-Württemberg and of Bavaria, Germany.

In its upper course, the Schwarzenbach forms the border between Baden-Württemberg and Bavaria. In Baden-Württemberg in the district Neuravensburg of Wangen im Allgäu, it flows from the left into the Obere Argen.

See also
List of rivers of Baden-Württemberg
List of rivers of Bavaria

References

Rivers of Baden-Württemberg
Rivers of Bavaria
Rivers of Germany